Yakhin is a Tatar masculine surname originating from the Arabic given name Yahya, its feminine counterpart is Yakhina. It may refer to:

Alexei Yakhin (born 1984), Russian ice hockey goaltender 
Guzel Yakhina (born 1977), Russian author and screenwriter
Röstäm Yaxin (1921–1993), Tatar composer and pianist

References

Tatar-language surnames